was a town located in Sayō District, Hyōgo Prefecture, Japan.

As of 2003, the town had an estimated population of 5,387 and a density of 58.76 persons per km2. The total area was 91.68 km2.

On October 1, 2005, Kōzuki, along with the towns of Mikazuki and Nankō (all from Sayō District), was merged into the expanded town of Sayō.

External links
 Kozuki official website in Japanese

Dissolved municipalities of Hyōgo Prefecture
Sayō, Hyōgo